Hauptmann's Ladder: A Step-by-Step Analysis of the Lindbergh Kidnapping is a historical true crime book written by Richard T. Cahill Jr. It was published by Kent State University Press and officially released on March 1, 2014, the 82nd anniversary of the kidnapping.

The book details the Lindbergh kidnapping from the night of the crime to the conviction of Bruno Richard Hauptmann on February 13, 1935. The book has been described by noted true crime author Harold Schechter as "the definitive account of the Lindbergh Kidnapping".

Lindbergh kidnapping
Non-fiction crime books
2014 non-fiction books
Kent State University Press books